Lurman may refer to:
Someone in Carnival of Monsters
Francis Lurman, a fictional villain